Red. White. Green. is the second studio album by American metalcore band Upon a Burning Body. The album was released on April 10, 2012 through Sumerian Records. The album was produced by Will Putney, who produced their debut album, The World Is Ours. All of the songs on the album are titled after films, continuing a trend set from their debut album, but this time mostly films that Robert Rodriguez produced or directed. It is the only album with Jonathan Gonzalez on drums and the last album with Chris "CJ" Johnson on guitar.
Music videos were made for "Once Upon a Time in Mexico", "Sin City" and "Texas Blood Money". Also, a lyric video was made for "Mimic". The music video for "Sin City" was shot during a live performance at LKA Longhorn in Stuttgart, Germany.

Track listing

Credits
 Upon A Burning Body
 Danny Leal - vocals
 Sal Dominguez - lead guitar
 Chris "C.J." Johnson - rhythm guitar
 Ruben Alvarez - bass 
 Jonathon Gonzalez - drums

 Guest musicians
Chris Fronzak (Attila)  –  Vocals on "Mimic"
Johnny Plague (Winds of Plague)  –  Vocals on "Predators"
Nate Johnson (Fit for an Autopsy)  –  Vocals on "From Dusk Till Dawn"

 Production
 Engineering – Will Putney (Fit For An Autopsy)
 Additional Engineering – Charles Busacca; Drew Fulk; Alberto de Icaza
 Mixing – Will Putney (Fit For An Autopsy)
 Mastering – Will Putney (Fit For An Autopsy)
 Artwork – 616 Visual; McBride Design
 UABB logo – Mike Belenda

Chart performance

References

2012 albums
Upon a Burning Body albums
Sumerian Records albums
Albums produced by Will Putney